Chant (foaled 1891 in Kentucky) was an American Thoroughbred racehorse that won the 1894 Kentucky Derby, Phoenix Stakes, and Clark Handicap. He was related through his damsire, King Alfonso, to Kentucky Derby winners Fonso (1880) and Joe Cotton (1885) and through his sire, Falsetto, to His Eminence (1901) and Sir Huon (1906).

Chant was sold in September 1894 to Charles Head Smith for $5,100 at auction when Leigh & Rose dissolved their partnership. Chant injured his leg in February 1895 but was entered in several races at a track in Saratoga Springs, New York in July 1895, finishing second in one of them to a horse named Sir Excess and winning $375 in a small stakes race in August 1895.

A 1910 Daily Racing Form article reports that Chant was sold to a western Thoroughbred breeder and produced a few stakes winners in California. He was still reported as being alive in 1910.

Pedigree

References

1891 racehorse births
Racehorses trained in the United States
Racehorses bred in Kentucky
Kentucky Derby winners
Thoroughbred family A3